Two ships in the United States Navy have been named USS Wickes, in honor of Lambert Wickes.

 The first  was the lead ship in her class of destroyers during World War I.
 The second  was a  during World War II.

United States Navy ship names